The Soo Line B-4 class were 0-6-0 steam locomotives constructed for the Minneapolis, St. Paul and Sault Ste. Marie Railway (Soo Line) by the American Locomotive Company. Six (#344–349) were built at their Schenectady plant in 1915, with a further five (#350–354) being constructed by their Brooks plant in Dunkirk, New York, in 1920.

They were the last, and largest design of purpose-built switch engines that the Soo Line owned, any heavier switching duties were performed by down-graded 2-8-0 freight engines. All were still on the active roster in May 1953, but all had been retired by the end December 1954 when the railroad completed its dieselization.

Two are preserved - #346 from the first batch, which is displayed at the Wheels Across the Prairie Museum at Tracy, Minnesota, as Dakota, Minnesota and Eastern #9, and #353 from the second batch, which is operational and gives free rides annually at the Western Minnesota Steam Thresher's Reunion, Rollag, Minnesota.

References

B-04
0-6-0 locomotives
ALCO locomotives
Railway locomotives introduced in 1915
Steam locomotives of the United States
Standard gauge locomotives of the United States